Dorothy Bourne Andrus Voorhees (June 14, 1908 – September 28, 1989) was an American female tennis player who ranked No. 10 among the U.S. amateurs in 1932.

She was the granddaughter of New York Congressman John Emory Andrus.

She twice reached the final of the women's doubles competition at the U.S. National Championships (now US Open). In 1934 she partnered with Carolin Babcock and lost the final in three sets against Helen Jacobs and Sarah Palfrey Cooke. A year later, 1935, exactly the same final was played and this time she lost in two straight sets. Her best singles performance at a Grand Slam tournament came in 1934 when she reached the semifinals at the U.S. National Championships but lost in two sets to Sarah Palfrey Cooke.

In August 1931, she married Walter Anthony Burke, and the couple divorced, remarried, then ended their marriage permanently.

She later married Charles Voorhees and remained married until her death in 1989. They had two sons together, John and Charles.

Grand Slam finals

Doubles (2 runner-ups)

References

External links
National Portrait Gallery image

American female tennis players
1908 births
1989 deaths
Sportspeople from New York City
20th-century American women
20th-century American people
Tennis people from New York (state)